Romfo is a village in Sunndal Municipality in Møre og Romsdal county, Norway. The village is located along the river Driva in the Sunndalen valley. The Norwegian National Road 70 runs through the village which is most known as the site of Romfo Church.

See also
Other neighboring villages in Sunndal municipality: Gjøra, Grøa, Hoelsand, Jordalsgrenda, Ålvund, Ålvundeidet, and Øksendalsøra.

References

Villages in Møre og Romsdal
Sunndal